This discography of D'Angelo documents the release of studio albums, live recordings, compilation albums, and other songs.

Albums

Studio albums

Compilation albums

Live albums

Extended plays

Singles

As lead artist

 1 Only peaked on the US Billboard R&B/Hip-Hop Airplay Tracks chart.

As featured artist

Other charted songs

Other contributions
This list excludes recordings which only include samples of D'Angelo recordings.

 "Pray" on Vertical Hold's 'Head First' album (1994)
 "Crew" keyboards on A Tribe Called Quest's Beats, Rhymes and Life album (1996)
 "Overjoyed" on Boys Choir of Harlem's 'Up in Harlem' album (1996)
 "Girl You Need a Change of Mind" on Get on the Bus soundtrack album (1996)
 "The Hypnotic" collaboration on The Roots' Illadelph Halflife album (1996)
 "I Found My Smile Again" on the Space Jam soundtrack album (1997)
 "Ain't Nobody Home" collaboration on B.B.King's Deuces Wild album (1997)
 "The 'Notic" collaboration with The Roots (featuring Erykah Badu) on Men in Black soundtrack album (1997)
 "Heaven Must Be Like This" on Down In The Delta soundtrack album (1998)
 "Nothing Even Matters" collaboration on Lauryn Hill's The Miseducation of Lauryn Hill album (1998)
 "She's Always in My Hair" on Scream 2 soundtrack album (1998)
 "The Spark" keyboards on The Roots' Things Fall Apart album (1999)
 "Everyday" collaboration and production on Angie Stone's Black Diamond album (1999)
 "Time Travelin'", "Time Travelin' (Reprise)", "Geto Heaven Part Two" and "Cold-Blooded" collaborations on Common's Like Water for Chocolate album (2000)
 "Everybody Loves The Sunshine" on D'Angelo's Untitled (How Does It Feel?) single (2000)
 "Tell Me" collaboration on Slum Village's Fantastic, Vol. 2 album (2000)
 "Caravan" collaboration with The Roots on the various artists' Red Hot + Indigo Duke Ellington tribute / charity fund-raising album (2000)
 "Talk S*** 2 Ya" collaboration on Baby Boy soundtrack album (2001)
 "Water No Got Enemy" collaboration with various artists on Red Hot + Riot: The Music and Spirit of Fela Kuti tribute / charity fund-raising album (2002)
 "I'll Stay" collaboration on Roy Hargrove's The RH Factor: Hard Groove album (2003)
 "Be Here" live collaboration on Raphael Saadiq's All Hits at the House of Blues album (2005)
 "Sing a Simple Song" virtual collaboration with Sly and The Family Stone, featuring Isaac Hayes and Chuck D on Different Strokes by Different Folks tribute album (2006)
 "Bullsh*t" collaboration on Roy Hargrove's The RH Factor: Distractions album (2006)
 "So Far to Go" collaboration on J Dilla's The Shining album (2006)
 "Believe" collaboration on Q-Tip's The Renaissance album (2008)
 "Natural" rhodes keyboards on Don-E's Natural album (2008)
 "Glass Mountain Trust" collaboration on Mark Ronson & The Business Intl's "Record Collection" album (2010)

Notes

References

Rhythm and blues discographies
Discographies of American artists
Discography
Soul music discographies